James Bray Bradley (November 19, 1858July 4, 1940) was the Michigan Auditor General from 1905 to 1908.

Early life
Bradley was born on November 19, 1858 in Middlebury Township, Michigan to parents Albert B. and 	
Jerusha Louise Bradley.

Education
Bradley graduated from Rush Medical College in 1886.

Career
Bradley worked as a physician and surgeon in Grand Rapids, Michigan. Bradley was elected to the position of Michigan Auditor General in 1904, and served from 1905 to 1908. Bradley was a candidate in the Republican primary for the 1908 Michigan gubernatorial election. Bradley was a presidential elector from Michigan in 1928.

Personal life
Bradley married Jennie Frost in 1885. After Bradley was widowed in 1913, he remarried to Pearl Parshall on October 12, 1915. Bradley was a member of the American Medical Association, the Knights Templar, the Shriners, the Knights of Pythias, and the Maccabees. Bradley was Freemason. Bradley was Methodist.

Death
Bradley died in Eaton Rapids, Michigan on July 4, 1940.

References

1858 births
1940 deaths
American Freemasons
Michigan Auditors General
Michigan Republicans
Rush Medical College alumni
1928 United States presidential electors
Farmers from Michigan
Methodists from Michigan
19th-century American physicians
20th-century American politicians